Aneta Dědinová (born 9 March 1994) is a Czech footballer who plays as a midfielder for Sparta Prague in the Czech First Division.

She is a member of the Czech national team and made her debut for the national team in a match against Poland on 20 August 2013.

References

External links 
 
 
 

1994 births
Living people
Czech women's footballers
Sportspeople from Příbram
Czech Republic women's international footballers
Women's association football midfielders
AC Sparta Praha (women) players
SK Slavia Praha (women) players
Czech Women's First League players